Alfred Newton Handy was a minister, landowner, and state legislator in Mississippi.

He was born in Georgia. He represented Madison County, Mississippi in the Mississippi House of Representatives from 1870 to 1875.

He served with David Jenkins, an African American who also represented Madison County in the Mississippi House.

See also
 African-American officeholders during and following the Reconstruction era

References

Members of the Mississippi House of Representatives
People from Madison County, Mississippi
African-American politicians during the Reconstruction Era
African-American state legislators in Mississippi
Year of birth missing
Year of death missing